Jonathan Wilmet (born 7 January 1986) is a Belgian former professional footballer who played as a midfielder.

Career
Wilmet made his debut in professional football as a part of the Willem II squad in the 2005–06 season. In 2008, he moved to Sint-Truiden in the Belgian Second Division, enjoying promotion in his first season. He played one more season with Sint-Truiden at the highest level before moving to Mechelen where he played from 2010 to 2012. In 2012, he moved back to the Second Division as he signed with Westerlo, before joining Oostende the following year.

In January 2015, Wilmet was loaned out to Waasland-Beveren for six months, with an option on a permanent contract for two seasons. The option was exercised, but in August, Wilmet was loaned out to Belgian Second Division club Deinze for a year. Wilmet then played for another year for lower tier side Wallonia Walhain, and retired from football afterwards.

References

External links
 
 

1986 births
Living people
Belgian footballers
Willem II (football club) players
Sint-Truidense V.V. players
K.V. Mechelen players
K.V.C. Westerlo players
K.V. Oostende players
S.K. Beveren players
K.M.S.K. Deinze players
Belgian Pro League players
Challenger Pro League players
Eredivisie players
Belgian expatriate footballers
Expatriate footballers in the Netherlands
Belgian expatriate sportspeople in the Netherlands
Association football midfielders
R.W.D. Molenbeek players
RC Lens players
Nottingham Forest F.C. players
R. Wallonia Walhain Chaumont-Gistoux players
People from Ottignies-Louvain-la-Neuve
Footballers from Walloon Brabant